"Loving You's a Dirty Job but Somebody's Gotta Do It" is a song performed by Welsh singer Bonnie Tyler and American singer Todd Rundgren, taken from Tyler's sixth studio album, Secret Dreams and Forbidden Fire (1986). Written and produced by Jim Steinman, the track was released as the second single from the album in 1985. Artwork for the single features cover paintings by the British artist and designer Edward Burne-Jones. 12-inch editions feature the cover painting The Beguiling of Merlin while 7-inch editions feature Phyllis and Demophoon. Some territories feature a photograph of Tyler. The music video features Welsh actor Hywel Bennett miming Rundgren's lines. The song has been re-recorded by Meat Loaf on his 2016 album Braver Than We Are, as a duet with Stacy Michelle.

Credits and personnel
Roy Bittan – piano, synthesizer
Jimmy Bralower – drums, percussion
Steve Buslowe – bass guitar
Larry Fast – synthesizer
Eddie Martinez – guitar
Sid McGinnis – guitar
Max Weinberg – drums
Bonnie Tyler – vocal
Rory Dodd – background vocal
Todd Rundgren – featured artist, background vocal
Eric Troyer – background vocal

Track listings 
 7-inch single
 "Loving You's a Dirty Job but Somebody's Gotta Do It" (Jim Steinman) — 5:40
 "Under Suspicion" (B. Tyler, P. Hopkins, P. Oxendale) — 4:24

 12-inch maxi
 "Loving You's a Dirty Job but Somebody's Gotta Do It" (long version) (Jim Steinman) — 7:48
 "Under Suspicion" (B. Tyler, P. Hopkins, P. Oxendale) — 4:24
 "It's a Jungle Out There" (Dennis Polen, Paul Pilger, William Moloney) — 3:57

Charts

Meat Loaf version 

The song was re-recorded by Meat Loaf on his 2016 album Braver Than We Are, as a duet with Stacy Michelle, under the slightly modified title of Loving You Is a Dirty Job (But Somebody's Gotta Do It). On this version, the male and female vocals are reversed, with the male vocal being the lead, whereas on Bonnie Tyler's version, the female vocal sings the lead. It was not issued as a single for the album.

References 

1985 singles
1985 songs
2016 songs
Bonnie Tyler songs
CBS Records singles
Song recordings produced by Jim Steinman
Songs written by Jim Steinman
Meat Loaf songs
Todd Rundgren songs
Male–female vocal duets
Music videos directed by Tim Pope